A shot tower is used for the production of lead shot.

Places named Shot Tower include:

Shot Tower (Dubuque), United States
Shot Tower, Lambeth, England
Shot Tower, Taroona, Tasmania
Jackson Ferry Shot Tower, Virginia, United States
Phoenix Shot Tower, Baltimore, United States listed on the NRHP in Maryland
Shot Tower station, a nearby metro station
 Shot Tower (Max Meadows, Virginia), listed on the NRHP in Virginia
 Shot Tower (Spring Green, Wisconsin),  listed on the NRHP in Wisconsin
George W. Rogers Company Shot Tower, Dubuque, Iowa, listed on the NRHP in Iowa